Nerses II may refer to:

 Nerses II, Catholicos of Armenia in 548–557
 Nerses II, Armenian Patriarch of Constantinople in 1874–1884